The Armenia national football team represents Armenia in association football and is controlled by the Football Federation of Armenia (FFA), the governing body of the sport in the country. It competes as a member of the Union of European Football Associations (UEFA), which encompasses the countries of Europe.

Armenia joined the International Federation of Association Football (FIFA) in 1992, and played its first official match against Moldova on 14 October 1992.

Results

All time record
Key

P = Matches played
W = Matches won
D = Matches drawn
L = Matches lost
GF = Goals for
GA = Goals against
+/– = Goal difference
Countries are listed in alphabetical order

International goalscorers

All goalscorers from Armenia national football team results.

32 goals

Henrikh Mkhitaryan

14 goals

Yura Movsisyan
Gevorg Ghazaryan

11 goals

Artur Petrosyan
Marcos Pizzelli

9 goals

Edgar Manucharyan

7 goal

Ara Hakobyan
Tigran Barseghyan

6 goal

Armen Shahgeldyan
Artur Sarkisov
Aras Özbiliz
Aleksandre Karapetian

5 goal

Robert Arzumanyan
Arman Karamyan

4 goal

Tigran Yesayan
Hovhannes Hambardzumyan

3 goal

Éric Assadourian
Vahan Bichakhchyan
Ruslan Koryan
Varazdat Haroyan
Albert Sarkisyan

2 goal

Sargis Adamyan
Wbeymar Angulo
Ararat Arakelyan
Garnik Avalyan
Khoren Bayramyan
Karen Dokhoyan
Razmik Grigoryan
Kamo Hovhannisyan
Rumyan Hovsepyan
Sargis Hovsepyan
Artavazd Karamyan
Karapet Mikaelyan
Hamlet Mkhitaryan
Gegam Kadimyan
Karlen Mkrtchyan
Andrey Movsisyan
Levon Pachajyan
Eduard Spertsyan

1 goal

Armen Adamyan
Arsen Avetisyan
Varazdat Avetisyan
Edgar Babayan
Zaven Badoyan
Karen Barseghyan
Hovhannes Goharyan
Artak Grigoryan
Aram Hakobyan
Hayk Hakobyan
Levon Hayrapetyan
Hayk Ishkanyan
Artur Kartashyan
Romik Khachatryan
Vardan Khachatryan
Felix Khojoyan
Gagik Manukyan
Arthur Minasyan
Vahagn Minasyan
Hrayr Mkoyan
Aghvan Mkrtchyan
Rafael Nazaryan
Galust Petrosyan
Hakob Ter-Petrosyan
Karen Simonyan
Erik Vardanyan
Harutyun Vardanyan
Artur Voskanyan
Ivan Yagan
Artak Yedigaryan

Own goal

Óscar Sonejee (12 October 2005 vs Andorra)
Xavier García (1 June 2016 vs El Salvador)
Noah Frommelt (25 March 2021 vs Liechtenstein)

References

External links

Armenia at FIFA
Armenia at UEFA

 
Armenia national football team